Maiasaura (from the Greek μαῖα, meaning "good mother" and σαύρα, the feminine form of saurus, meaning "reptile") is a large herbivorous saurolophine hadrosaurid ("duck-billed") dinosaur genus that lived in the area currently covered by the state of Montana and the province of Alberta, Canada in the Upper Cretaceous Period (mid to late Campanian), about 76.7 million years ago.

The first remains of Maiasaura were discovered in 1978 by Bynum, Montana resident Laurie Trexler. The genus was named in 1979. The name refers to the find of nests with eggs, embryos and young animals, in a nesting colony. These showed that Maiasaura fed its young while they were in the nest, the first time such evidence was obtained for a dinosaur. Hundreds of bones of Maiasaura have been dug up.

Young animals walked on their hind legs, adults on all fours. Maiasaura was probably closely related to Brachylophosaurus.

Description

They had a flat beak typical of hadrosaurids, and thick noses. They had a small, spiky crest in front of the eyes. This crest may have been used in headbutting contests between males during the breeding season.

Maiasaura were herbivorous. They were capable of walking both on two (bipedal) or four (quadrupedal) legs. Studies of the stress patterns of healed bones show that young juveniles under four years old walked mainly bipedal, switching to a mainly quadrupedal style of walking when they grew larger. Maiasaura, like most other hadrosaurs, possessed little in the way of obvious weaponry, though likely could defend themselves with kicks, stomps, or their muscular tails. It is likely that they primarily resorted to fleeing in the face of danger, using the vast sizes of their herds to be less likely to be targeted. Herds were extremely large and could have comprised as many as 10,000 individuals. Maiasaura lived in an inland habitat.

Discovery
 
A skull of Maiasaura, specimen PU 22405 (now in the collections of the Yale Peabody Museum of Natural History as YPM PU 22405 following the transfer of the Princeton University vertebrate paleontology collections), was discovered by Laurie Trexler in 1979 and described by dinosaur paleontologists Jack Horner and Robert Makela as the holotype of a new species. They named the type species Maiasaura peeblesorum. The generic name refers to the Greek goddess Maia, the "Good Mother"; to emphasise this, they used the feminine form of saurus: saura. The specific name honours the families of John and James Peebles, on whose land the finds were made. The generic name refers to Marion Brandvold's discovery in 1978 of a nest with remains of eggshells and babies too large to be hatchlings. These discoveries led to others, and the area became known as "Egg Mountain", in rocks of the Two Medicine Formation near Choteau in western Montana. This was the first proof of giant dinosaurs raising and feeding their young.

Over 200 specimens, in all age ranges, have been found. The announcement of the discovery of Maiasaura attracted renewed scientific interest to the Two Medicine Formation and many other new kinds of dinosaurs were discovered as a result of the increased attention. Choteau Maiasaura remains are found in higher strata than their Two Medicine River counterparts.

Classification
 
 
The following cladogram of hadrosaurid relationships was published in 2013 by Alberto Prieto-Márquez et al.:

Palaeobiology
Maiasaura lived in herds and it raised its young in nesting colonies. The nests were made of earth and contained 30 to 40 eggs laid in a circular or spiral pattern. The eggs were about the size of ostrich eggs.

The eggs were incubated by the heat resulting from rotting vegetation placed into the nest by the parents, rather than a parent sitting on the nest. Upon hatching, fossils of baby Maiasaura show that their legs were not fully developed and thus they were incapable of walking. Fossils also show that their teeth were partly worn, which means that the adults brought food to the nest.

At this point, or perhaps after another year, the animal left the nest. This high rate of growth may be evidence of warm bloodedness. The hatchlings had different facial proportions from the adults, with larger eyes and a shorter snout. These features are associated with cuteness, and commonly elicit care from parents in animals dependent on their parents for survival during the early stages of life.

Studies led by Holly Woodward, Jack Horner, Freedman Fowler et al. have given insight into the life history of Maiasaura, resulting in what is perhaps the most detailed life history of any dinosaur known, and to which all others can be compared. From a sample of fifty individual Maiasaura tibiae, it was found that Maiasaurs had a mortality rate of about 89.9% in their first year of life. If the animals survived their second year, their mortality rate would drop to 12.7%. The animals would spend their next six years maturing and growing. Sexual maturity was found to occur in their third year, while skeletal maturity was attained at eight years of age. In their eighth year and beyond, the mortality rate for Maiasaura would spike back to around 44.4%. The studies that followed also found that Maiasaurs were primarily bipedal as juveniles, and switched to a more quadrupedal stance as they aged. It was also found that Maiasaura also included rotting wood in its diet, as well that its environment had a long, dry season prone to drought. The results of the study were published in the journal Palaeobiology on September 3, 2015.

Diet
A paper from 2007 showed that Maiasaura had a diet consisting of fibrous plants, wood, rotting wood, tree bark, leaves, branches, ferns, angiosperms and possibly grasses. This would imply that Maiasaura was both a browser and a grazer.

Sexual dimorphism 
Studies of Maiasaura by Saitta et al., suggest that one sex was roughly 45% larger than the other according to the mathematical analysis known as size statistics. However, it cannot be ascertained at this time whether the larger gender was male or female.

Palaeoecology

Maiasaura is a characteristic fossil of the middle portion (lithofacies 4) of the Two Medicine Formation, dated to about 76.4 million years ago. Maiasaura lived alongside the troodontid Troodon and the  basal ornithopod Orodromeus, as well as the dromaeosaurid Bambiraptor and the tyrannosaur Daspletosaurus. Another species of hadrosaurids, referable to the genus Hypacrosaurus, coexisted with Maiasaura for some time, as Hypacrosaurus remains have been found lower in the Two Medicine Formation than was earlier known. The discovery of an additional hadrosaurid, Gryposaurus latidens, in the same range as Maiasaura has shown that the border between hypothesized distinct faunas in the upper and middle is less distinct than once thought. There seems to be a major diversification in ornithischian taxa after the appearance of Maiasaura within the Two Medicine Formation. The thorough examination of strata found along the Two Medicine River (which exposes the entire upper half of the Two Medicine Formation) indicates that the apparent diversification was a real event rather than a result of preservational biases. While Maiasaura has historically been associated with the Two Medicine formation ceratopsid Einiosaurus in a single fauna, this is inaccurate, as Maiasaura is known exclusively from older strata.

In the Oldman Formation of Alberta, Maiasaura lived alongside the ceratopsians Albertaceratops, Anchiceratops, Chasmosaurus, Coronosaurus, and Wendiceratops, as well as the dromaeosaurids Dromaeosaurus, Saurornitholestes, and  Hesperonychus, the tyrannosaurid Daspletosaurus, the orodromine thescelosaurid Albertadromeus, the pachycephalosaurs Foraminacephale and Hanssuesia, the ornithomimid Struthiomimus, the other hadrosaurids Brachylophosaurus, Corythosaurus, and Parasaurolophus, and the ankylosaurid Scolosaurus.

See also

 Timeline of hadrosaur research

Footnotes

References

 Dodson, Peter & Britt, Brooks & Carpenter, Kenneth & Forster, Catherine A. & Gillette, David D. & Norell, Mark A. & Olshevsky, George & Parrish, J. Michael & Weishampel, David B. The Age of Dinosaurs. Publications International, LTD. p. 116-117. .
 Horner, Jack and Gorman, James. (1988). Digging Dinosaurs: The Search that Unraveled the Mystery of Baby Dinosaurs, Workman Publishing Co.
 Lehman, T. M., 2001, Late Cretaceous dinosaur provinciality: In: Mesozoic  Vertebrate Life, edited by Tanke, D. H., and Carpenter, K., Indiana University  Press, pp. 310–328.
 
 Trexler, D., 2001, Two Medicine Formation, Montana: geology and fauna: In:  Mesozoic Vertebrate Life, edited by Tanke, D. H., and Carpenter, K., Indiana  University Press, pp. 298–309.

Fossils of Canada
Oldman fauna
Paleontology in Alberta
Late Cretaceous dinosaurs of North America
Monotypic dinosaur genera
Paleontology in Montana
Saurolophines
Fossil taxa described in 1979
Taxa named by Jack Horner
Campanian life
Campanian genus first appearances
Campanian genus extinctions
Ornithischian genera